A landmark is a notable geographical feature or building.

Landmark, The Landmark, Landmark Building, or similar may also refer to:

Places
Landmark, Manitoba, Canada
Landmark, Arkansas, United States
Landmark, Missouri, United States

Art, entertainment, and media

Games
Landmark (video game), a discontinued video game

Music
Landmark (Asian Kung-Fu Generation album), 2012
Landmarks (Clannad album), 1997
Landmarks (Joe Lovano album), 1990
Landmark (Salyu album), 2005
Landmark (Hippo Campus album), 2017

Television
Landmark (TV series), a Canadian current affairs television series 
"Landmarks" (How I Met Your Mother), a 2011 episode of the sitcom How I Met Your Mother
 The Landmark (album)

Buildings

United Kingdom
Landmark, Manchester, an approved office building in Manchester
The Landmark London, a hotel in the City of Westminster, London
The Landmark, a pair of skyscrapers at 22 Marsh Wall in Canary Wharf, London

United States
The Landmark, also known as the Southern Pacific Building in San Francisco, California
Landmark Center (Boston), a commercial building in Boston, Massachusetts
Landmark (hotel and casino), Paradise, Nevada
Landmark Office Towers Complex, a complex of three high-rises in Cleveland, Ohio
Medical Arts Building (San Antonio), San Antonio, Texas, renamed to "Landmark Building" in the 1970s
Landmark Mall, a mall in Alexandria, Virginia

Other places
Landmark 81, a super-tall skyscraper in Ho Chi Minh City, Vietnam
Keangnam Hanoi Landmark Tower, a skyscraper in Hanoi, Vietnam
The Landmark (Abu Dhabi), a skyscraper in Abu Dhabi, United Arab Emirates
The Landmark (Hong Kong), an office and shopping development in Hong Kong
Yokohama Landmark Tower, skyscraper in Yokohama, Japan

Organizations
Landmark, an Australian agribusiness and wholly owned subsidiary of Agrium, Inc
Landmark (company), a serviced office provider in the UK
Landmark (department store), a Philippine department store and supermarket chain
Landmark Aviation, a company offering FBO services for aircraft
Landmark Bookstores, an Indian bookstore chain
Landmark Cinemas, a Canadian film exhibition chain
Landmark College, a college in Putney, Vermont
Landmark Conference an NCAA Division III athletic conference
Landmark Global, an international division of the Belgian Post Group
Landmark Group, an Emirati group of shops
Landmark Legal Foundation, an American conservative legal advocacy group.
Landmark Media Enterprises, an American media company
Landmark Theatre (disambiguation)
Landmark Theatres, an American theatre chain
Landmark Trust, a British charity that rescues and restores at-risk buildings
Landmark Worldwide, or Landmark Education, a company offering self-development seminars, formerly known as Erhard Seminars Training (EST).
Landmarks (University of Texas at Austin), a public art collection at the University of Texas at Austin
Philadelphia Society for the Preservation of Landmarks, also known simply as Landmarks

Other uses
Anatomical landmark, in medicine
Landmark decision, a legal ruling of great importance
Landmark case
Landmark Forest Adventure Park, a theme park in Scotland, UK aimed at children
Landmark point, a point in a shape that corresponds between similar shapes
Landmarkism, or Landmark Baptists, a revivalist movement particularly popular among American Baptists
Masonic Landmarks, a set of principles in Freemasonry

See also
Land survey marker
National landmark (disambiguation), a site possessing nationally significant natural, historic, or scientific resources